The IEEE STANDARD 1849-2016, IEEE Standard for eXtensible Event Stream (XES) for Achieving Interoperability in Event Logs and Event Streams, is a technical standard developed by the IEEE Standards Association. It standardizes  "a  language  to  transport, store,  and  exchange (possibly  large  volumes  of)  event  data  (e.g., for process mining)" 

Process mining aims to discover, monitor and improve processes by extracting knowledge from event logs representing actual process executions in a given setting. Process mining depends on the availability of accurate and unambiguous event logs, according to established standards. As  such,  this  standard  aims  to  fix  the  syntax  and  the  semantics  of  the  event  data  which,  for  example,  is  being  transferred  from  the  site  generating  this  data  to  the  site  analyzing  this  data. As  a  result  of  this  standard,  if  the  event data is transferred using the syntax as  described  by  this  standard,  its  semantics will be well understood and clear at both sites.

IEEE 1849 was the second IEEE Standard Sponsored by the IEEE Computational Intelligence Society. The first was IEEE 1855.

References

External links

 (http://standards.ieee.org/findstds/standard/1849-2016.html)
 (http://www.win.tue.nl/ieeetfpm/doku.php) 

IEEE standards
Data management